Apostles of Defiance is a 2003 album by Eidolon.

The album was reviewed with 3/5 in Allmusic, 69/100 in Metal Rules, 7/10 in Metal.de, and 8.0 in Rockhard.de.

Track listing
All music except track 10 by Glen and Shawn Drover
All lyrics except track 10 by Shawn Drover

"Scream From Within"
"Volcanic Earth"
"Demoralized"
"Twisted Morality"
"The Test"
"The Will To Remain"
"Apostles Of Defiance"
"Pull The Trigger"
"Apathy For A Dying World"
"In Context of the Moon" (Max Webster cover featuring Terry Watkinson)

Credits
 Pat Mulock - Lead vocals
 Glen Drover - Guitars, vocals
 Adrian Robichaud - Bass
 Shawn Drover - Drums, vocals

References

2003 albums
Eidolon (band) albums